The 1963–64 Liga Leumit season saw Hapoel Ramat Gan win their first, and to date only championship. They were the first club to win the title the season after being promoted, having been in Liga Alef the previous season.

Maccabi Jaffa's Israel Ashkenazi was the league's top scorer with 21 goals, whilst Hapoel Lod were relegated at the end of their first season in the top division.

Final table

Results

References 
 Israel - List of final tables RSSSF

Liga Leumit seasons
 1